Sodo–Moyale–Suswa High Voltage Power Line (or Ethiopia–Kenya HVDC Interconnector) is a 500 kV bipolar high-voltage direct current electricity power transmission line, under construction, connecting the Wolayta converter station near Sodo, Ethiopia with the Suswa converter station near Suswa, Kenya.

Location

Overview
This power line serves one major purpose. It will enable Ethiopia to transfer surplus electricity to Kenya, for sale to the countries of the East African Community and the Great Lakes Region. The power generated in Ethiopia is less expensive than that generated in Kenya, and the new energy purchases are expected to lower the general power tariffs in Kenya and promote industrial growth in the country.

The entire power line in both countries is budgeted at KSh126 billion (approximately US$1.26 billion). Funding was sourced from the World Bank and the African Development Bank, the principal financier. Completion is expected in June 2019. In August 2018, The EastAfrican reported that at that time, 75 percent of the work in Kenya was complete, while simultaneously, 90 percent of the work in Ethiopia was complete, with commissioning expected in 2019.

Construction in Ethiopia

CET is also responsible for cross-border cabling and a  section in Kenya, near a place called Logologo. A new 500kV substation in Sodo is included in the scope of work. In September 2019, it was reported that CET had completed construction of the Ethiopian section of this power line.

Construction in Kenya
KEC International Limited (KEC), an Indian company, is contracted to build the  section from Elboro to Logologo, both in Marsabit County.

A new 500kV substation is included in the scope of work.

See also
 Energy in Ethiopia
 Energy in Kenya
 Loiyangalani-Suswa High Voltage Power Line

References

External links
CIGRÉ South Africa 2015 conference paper:
 Paulo Edmundo da Fonseca Freire et al. (2015): "HVDC link Kenya–Ethiopia – Ground Electrodes Site Selection"

Ethiopia–Kenya Power Systems Interconnection Project documents (including details, maps, etc.):
 Environmental and Social Impact Assessment (ESIA) Summary, August 2011
 Resettlement Action Plan (RAP) Final Report – Ethiopia section, January 2012
 Resettlement Action Plan (RAP) Final Report – Kenya section, February 2012
 Project Appraisal Report, September 2012

HVDC transmission lines
Proposed energy infrastructure in Africa
High-voltage transmission lines in Ethiopia
High-voltage transmission lines in Kenya
Ethiopia–Kenya relations